Bardeh Rash-e Kuchek (also Romanized as Bardeh Rash-e Kūchek; also known as Bardeh Rash, Bardeh Rasheh, Bard-e Rash, and Bard Rasheh) is a village in Sarshiv Rural District, Sarshiv District, Marivan County, Kurdistan Province, Iran. At the 2006 census, its population was 298, in 58 families. The village is populated by Kurds.

References 

Towns and villages in Marivan County
Kurdish settlements in Kurdistan Province